Studio Gigante was a Chicago-based video game developer established in 2000 by John Tobias, Dave Michicich, and Joshua Tsui, several developers of Midway's popular Mortal Kombat fighting game series. Its name is a play on the name of the television series Sábado Gigante. The company only released two games, both exclusive to the original Xbox. Its first release was Tao Feng: Fist of the Lotus, which debuted in 2003 to mixed reviews. The company's sophomore effort, 2005's WWE WrestleMania 21 was critically panned. Other games included a Kill Bill prototype where players could play as the main character. Nevertheless, the game was never finished since they closed down before finding a potential publisher. The studio folded in 2005 shortly after the game's release.

References

External links
Studio Gigante Inc.
Ex-worker blog

Defunct video game companies of the United States
Video game development companies
Defunct companies based in Chicago
Video game companies established in 2000
Video game companies disestablished in 2005